5 by Monk by 5 is an album by the jazz pianist Thelonious Monk, recorded in 1959. It contains five of Monk's original compositions performed by a quintet.

Recording and music
The album was recorded over three sessions in June 1959. In addition to Monk on piano, the musicians were Thad Jones (cornet), Charlie Rouse (tenor saxophone), Sam Jones (bass), and Art Taylor (drums). The title of the album comes from the quintet playing five of Monk's compositions. These included the new "Jackie-Ing", which Monk hummed to the others to help them learn it. The album also featured the debut of "Played Twice".

Releases and reception
5 by Monk by 5 was released by Riverside Records. The Penguin Guide to Jazz described it as "A relatively little-known Monk session, but a very good one." The AllMusic reviewer contrasted the complexity of the compositions with the contributions of Monk as a band member. The CD reissue by Original Jazz Classics added two previously rejected takes of "Played Twice".

Track listing 
All songs by Thelonious Monk unless otherwise noted.

Side One
Jackie-Ing – 6:06
Straight, No Chaser  – 9:21
Played Twice – 7:59
Side Two
"I Mean You" (Monk, Coleman Hawkins) – 9:47
"Ask Me Now" – 10:46

Personnel
Thelonious Monk – piano
Thad Jones – cornet
Charlie Rouse – tenor saxophone
Sam Jones – bass
Art Taylor – drums

References

1959 albums
Thelonious Monk albums
Albums produced by Orrin Keepnews
Riverside Records albums